Shashank Verma is an Indian politician. He was elected to the Uttar Pradesh Legislative Assembly from Nighasan (Kheri) in the by-election in 2019 as a member of the Bharatiya Janata Party. The by-election was held because the sitting MLA Patel Ramkumar Verma, Shashank Verma's father, had died in 2018.

References

1989 births
Living people
Bharatiya Janata Party politicians from Uttar Pradesh
People from Lakhimpur Kheri district
Uttar Pradesh MLAs 2022–2027